William H. Clapp is a social entrepreneur, philanthropist, business executive and founder and former chairman of the Matthew G. Norton Company, a property management firm based in Seattle. He is also the founder, along with his wife Paula, of Global Partnerships, Global Washington, and Seattle International Foundation.

Early life and career 
Clapp is the great-grand son of Weyerhaeuser Co. co-founder Matthew Norton. Bill began his career in Alaska in the 1960s, working as a bush pilot and businessman. He returned to Seattle in 1975, where he helped found the Matthew G. Norton Company, a real estate and property management firm. He served as CEO and Chairman until 2002.

Philanthropy

Global Partnerships 
Clapp and his wife, Paula, became interested in philanthropy and international development in the 1990s, after visiting a microlending program in El Salvador. In 1994, they founded Global Partnerships, a microlender with partner organizations in Central and South America, the Caribbean and Africa. Since its founding, the organization has provided loans and grants totaling $300 million to more than 10 million people. Bill served as Executive Director of the organization until 2006.

Initiative for Global Development 
In 2002, Clapp joined a group of policymakers, government officials, and philanthropists, including William H. Gates Sr., former U.S. Senator Daniel J. Evans, former EPA Administrator William D. Ruckelshaus, and former Chairman of the Joint Chiefs of Staff General John Shalikashvili, in founding the Initiative for Global Development. The Washington, D.C.-based organization invests in small businesses in Africa.

Global Washington 
Clappfounded Global Washington in 2008, and served as the organization's first chairman.

Seattle International Foundation 
In 2008, Clapp and his wife founded the Seattle International Foundation (SIF), a grant-making organization with a strategic focus on Central America. Since its founding, SIF has issued grants totaling $20 million to 243 organizations. In addition , it partners with such organizations as the Seattle Foundation and Global Washington to enhance international philanthropy efforts originating in the Pacific Northwest.

References 

Social entrepreneurs
American business executives
People from Seattle
Living people
Year of birth missing (living people)